Muhammad bin Indera ( – 30 January 1953), nicknamed Ahmad and widely known as Mat Indera, was a Malay communist leader during the Malayan Emergency, and was a member of Malayan Communist Party. He was a Muslim religious teacher ('ulama') before the Occupation of Japan in Malaya. He was renowned for leading 180 communists to launch a guerrilla assault on a police station during the Bukit Kepong Incident, causing deaths of almost all police officers in the station. Following the guerilla attack, the ruling British authorities placed a M$ 75,000 bounty on his head – a large sum of money at the time, equivalent to approximately RM500,000 in 2020 ringgit.

On the night of 14 October 1952, Mat Indera was invited to a "meeting" by some acquaintances in Kampung Seri Medan, at which he was served tempeh and coffee laced with Datura. After being incapacitated, he was handed over to the British, who charged him with crimes related to the Bukit Kepong incident. Mat Indera was subsequently found guilty and hanged at 11 pm on 30 January 1953 in Taiping Prison. There was another version of Mat Indera which discovered a different motive when he joined the communist guerilla attack. This version can be found in a book entitled Mat Indera: Pejuang atau Petualang published in Malaysia.

Controversial statement by PAS Deputy President 

On 21 August 2011, Mohamad Sabu, Deputy President of PAS, made a controversial statement saying that Mat Indera, the leader of the communists during the Bukit Kepong Incident, was a national hero for fighting against British rule.

References

Communism in Malaysia
Executed communists
Malaysian communists
People executed by British Malaya by hanging